Robin Richmond (21 April 1912 – 27 July 1998) was an English cinema organist and BBC Radio presenter and performer.

Richmond was born on 21 April 1912 in London. His father was a doctor. William Stephenson Richmond, his mother was Barbara Hamilton Archibald. He had a brother, John Whitaker Stephenson Richmond.  He was educated at Westminster School and London University, though he failed to graduate from the latter.

After a brief engagement at Lambeth Mission Hall, from which he was sacked for adding percussion sounds to hymns, he made his West End debut in the revue It's in the Bag. He then toured with the comedy singing duo The Two Leslies (Leslie Sarony and Leslie Holmes). His BBC Radio debut was in Palace of Varieties in 1938.

His trademark instrument became the Hammond organ, after he imported the first example to Great Britain from the United States in 1935. It carried the serial number "001". Rejected by the military during World War II for health reasons, Richmond spent the duration as organist at the Paramount Cinema in Tottenham Court Road, London, and on BBC radio.

Post-war, Richmond regularly performed on the BBC Light Programme, on shows such as Music While You Work, Variety Bandbox and Organ Grinder Swing. He also presented a number of programmes including Housewives' Choice and Jazz Club. On television, he was the resident organist on the quiz show Double Your Money.

He created the BBC Radio 2 series The Organist Entertains in 1969, and was its main presenter until 1980. A special edition in 2012 marked the centenary of his birth. He appeared as a castaway on the BBC Radio programme Desert Island Discs on 10 September 1977.

Richmond died of cancer on 27 July 1998, aged 86.

References

External links 

 

1912 births
1998 deaths
Place of death missing
BBC people
BBC Radio 2 presenters
Musicians from London
People educated at Westminster School, London
Alumni of the University of London
Theatre organists
20th-century organists